Vilho "Ville" Immanuel Tuulos (26 March 1895 – 2 September 1967) was a Finnish triple jumper and long jumper.

He won a gold medal in the triple jump at the 1920 Summer Olympics in Antwerp. The 14.50 meter jumps he made during the qualifying round was counted for the main event and were enough for the win. Tuulos also won bronze medals at the 1924 and 1928 Olympics. In the long jump, his best result was a fourth place at the 1924 Olympics.

Tuulos improved the European record in triple jump twice: on 20 July 1919 in Tampere with a result of 15.30 meters and on 6 July 1923 in Borås with 15.48 metres. The latter result stayed as the European record for over sixteen years, until Kaare Strøm jumped 15.49 metres in 1939.

Tuulos was the uncle of the Olympic figure skater Kalle Tuulos. He died in Tampere, aged 72.

References

1895 births
1967 deaths
Sportspeople from Tampere
Finnish male triple jumpers
Finnish male long jumpers
Olympic athletes of Finland
Athletes (track and field) at the 1920 Summer Olympics
Athletes (track and field) at the 1924 Summer Olympics
Athletes (track and field) at the 1928 Summer Olympics
Olympic gold medalists for Finland
Olympic bronze medalists for Finland
Medalists at the 1928 Summer Olympics
Medalists at the 1924 Summer Olympics
Medalists at the 1920 Summer Olympics
Olympic gold medalists in athletics (track and field)
Olympic bronze medalists in athletics (track and field)